Nativ (—"path") may refer to:

Organizations
 Nativ (conversion), a Military Rabbinate program to help Israeli Defense Forces soldiers convert to Judaism
 Nativ (liaison bureau), Israeli government organization that encouraged aliyah from the  Eastern Bloc
 , Israeli journal published by the 
 Nateev Express, a long-distance public transportation company in Israel
 Nativ College Leadership Program in Israel, a gap-year program of Conservative Judaism in Israel

People
 Nissan Nativ (1922–2008), Israeli actor
 Moshe Nativ  (1932–2008), Israeli major general

Other
 RTV-A-3 NATIV, American rocket

See also